Lek Kćira (born 28 January 1983) is a Croatian football player of Kosovar Albanian descent. Kćira mainly plays as central defender and he currently plays for ASKÖ Oberdorf in Austria.

Club career

Early career
Kcira played for Hrvatski Dragovoljac in Croatia in 2002. He then went on to play in Poland in 2005 with Górnik Łęczna. After a two-year spell in Poland he decided on a move back to his first club NK Hrvatski Dragovoljac. After one season he moved to NK Varteks in the top division, he played for the club for the first half of the 2007–2008 season.

KF Tirana
He joined KF Tirana on 1 February 2008. During the rest of the 2007–2008 campaign he became a first team regular and made 13 appearances scoring one goal. Kcira started the 2008–2009 season brightly but he only managed to play 8 league games due to injury.

Iranian clubs
After a short time in HNK Gorica, Kcira transferred to  Iranian club Steel Azin enjoyed playon there by scoring 2 goals in 19 matches. On the next seasons, he moved to Shahin Bushehr to work with his past manager Hamid Estili.

Kelantan
He had signed one-year contract with Malaysia Super League team Kelantan for 2013 season. He will be the 4th foreign player for the team to play in the 2013 AFC Cup.

In 2016 he played for NK Međimurje in the Croatian league.

Career statistics

Club

Honours

Club
Shahin Bushehr
Hazfi Cup Runner up: 2011–12

References

External links
 Profile at theredwarriorsfc.com

1983 births
Living people
Sportspeople from Prizren
Association football central defenders
Croatian footballers
Kosovan footballers
NK Hrvatski Dragovoljac players
Górnik Łęczna players
NK Varaždin players
KF Tirana players
HNK Gorica players
Steel Azin F.C. players
Shahin Bushehr F.C. players
Kelantan FA players
Lek Kcira
Duhok SC players
NK Zagorec Krapina players
NK Međimurje players
Croatian Football League players
Ekstraklasa players
Kategoria Superiore players
Persian Gulf Pro League players
Malaysia Super League players
Croatian expatriate footballers
Kosovan expatriate footballers
Expatriate footballers in Poland
Kosovan expatriate sportspeople in Poland
Expatriate footballers in Albania
Kosovan expatriate sportspeople in Albania
Expatriate footballers in Iran
Kosovan expatriate sportspeople in Iran
Expatriate footballers in Malaysia
Kosovan expatriate sportspeople in Malaysia
Expatriate footballers in Thailand
Expatriate footballers in Iraq
Expatriate footballers in Austria
Kosovan expatriate sportspeople in Austria